The 2016 UCI Cyclo-cross World Championships was the World Championship for cyclo-cross for the season 2015–16. It was held in Heusden-Zolder in Belgium on Saturday 30th and Sunday 31 January 2016. The championships featured five events, in addition to the men's and women's elite races there was a U23 men's and junior men's races, and for the first time, a U23 women's race.

Participants

Mechanical doping
Almost six years since the first allegations of “mechanical doping” in cycling the UCI, during the Women's under-23 race, for the first time in cycling history found evidence of technological fraud when they checked the bicycle of Femke Van den Driessche. The UCI had been testing a new detection system. The offence carries a minimum six-month suspension and a fine of between 20,000 and 200,000 Swiss francs.

Medal summary

Medalists

Medal table

Broadcasting
beIN Sports: Andorra, France, Madagascar, Mauritius, Monaco, France overseas, PAN Middle-East
Globosat: Brazil
NOS: the Netherlands
Rogers Sportsnet: Australia
RTBF: Belgium
TV2: Norway
Universal: the United States
Viasat: Denmark, Estonia, Latvia, Finland, Lithuania, Sweden
VRT: Belgium
news by SNTV: worldwide
news by Perform: worldwide

References

External links
 

 
2016 in cyclo-cross
2016
International cycle races hosted by Belgium
2016 in Belgian sport
January 2016 sports events in Europe